The Canadian Journal of Soil Science (French: Revue canadienne de la science du sol) is a Canadian quarterly academic journal which publishes research on the nature and management of soils. It was established in 1957, and it is published both in print and online.

References

External links

Canadian Science Publishing academic journals
Soil_science_journals
Multilingual_journals
English-language journals
French-language journals
1957 establishments in Canada